Neil Patrick Harris is an American actor, singer, writer, producer, and television host.

He's known for his comedy roles on television and his dramatic and musical stage roles. On TV, he is known for playing the title character on the ABC series Doogie Howser, M.D. (1989–1993), for which he was nominated for the Golden Globe Award for Best Actor – Television Series Musical or Comedy, as well as Barney Stinson on the CBS series How I Met Your Mother (2005–2014, for which he was nominated for four Emmy Awards), and Count Olaf on the Netflix series A Series of Unfortunate Events (2017–2019).

In 2010, Harris won two awards at the 62nd Primetime Emmy Awards, winning for Outstanding Guest Actor in a Comedy Series for his guest appearance on Glee, and Outstanding Special Class Program for hosting the Tony Awards in 2009; he has won the latter award three additional times for hosting the show in 2011, 2012, and 2013. He also hosted the Primetime Emmy Awards in 2009 and 2013, and hosted the 87th Academy Awards in 2015, thus making him the first openly gay man to host the Academy Awards. In 2014, he starred in the title role in Hedwig and the Angry Inch on Broadway, for which he won the 2014 Tony Award for Best Leading Actor in a Musical.

Major associations

Emmy Awards

Tony Awards

Grammy Awards

Golden Globe Awards

Miscellaneous awards

References

External links
 

Harris, Neil Patrick